The 1966–67 BBC2 Floodlit Trophy was the second occasion on which the BBC2 Floodlit Trophy competition had been held.

Castleford won the trophy by beating Swinton by the score of 7-2
The match was played at Wheldon Road , Castleford, now in West Yorkshire. The attendance was 8,986 and receipts were £1,692
This was to be the  second of Castleford's three victories in successive seasons in the  first three Floodlit competitions

Background 
This season the  original eight invitees were joined by Barrow, Rochdale Hornets and Salford bringing the total of entrants up to eleven, an increase of three.
This involved the  introduction of a preliminary knock-out round on a two legged home and away basis, to reduce the  numbers to eight, followed by a mini-league and with the semi-finals and final stages again being on a knock out basis.

Competition and results

Preliminary round – first leg  
Involved  3 matches and 6 Clubs

Preliminary round – second leg  
Involved  3 matches and 6 Clubs

Round 1 – first qualifying round 
Involved  4 matches and 8 Clubs

Round 2 – second qualifying round 
Involved 4 matches with the  same 8 clubs - but NOT reverse fixtures

Qualifying league table 

Pos = Finishing position   P = Games played   W = Wins   D = Drqw   L = Lose
PF = Points scored   PA = Points against   Pts = League points   PD = Points scored difference

To progress to the next stage 
The rules stated that the four clubs with the greatest total winning margins were to qualify, and proceed, to the semi-final.
The four clubs in this case were Castleford, Widnes, Swinton and Barrow

Round 3 – semi-finals  
Involved 2 matches and 4 Clubs

Final

Teams and scorers 

Scoring - Try = three (3) points - Goal = two (2) points - Drop goal = two (2) points

The play-offs

Notes and comments 
1 * Rochdale Hornets join the competition and play first game in the competition
2 * Salford join the competition and play first game in the competition, and first at home in the competition
3 * At the  time this was the highest score, highest aggregate score and greatest winning margin, but to be broken three weeks later
4 * Rochdale Hornets play their first game at home in the competition
5 * At the  time this was the highest score, highest aggregate score and greatest winning margin
6 * Barrow join the competition and play first game in the competition
7 * Barrow play their first game at home in the competition
8  * Wheldon Road is the home ground of Castleford. The first match was played there in 1927 and the current capacity in the region of 13,000 although the record attendance was 25,449 set in 1935 in a Challenge Cup match against Hunslet.

General information for those unfamiliar 
The Rugby League BBC2 Floodlit Trophy was a knock-out competition sponsored by the BBC and between rugby league clubs, entrance to which was conditional upon the club having floodlights. Most matches were played on an evening, and those of which the second half was televised, were played on a Tuesday evening.
Despite the competition being named as 'Floodlit', many matches took place during the afternoons and not under floodlights, and several of the entrants, including  Barrow and Bramley did not have adequate lighting. And, when in 1973, due to the world oil crisis, the government restricted the use of floodlights in sport, all the matches, including the Trophy final, had to be played in the afternoon rather than at night.
The Rugby League season always (until the onset of "Summer Rugby" in 1996) ran from around August-time through to around May-time and this competition always took place early in the season, in the Autumn, with the final taking place in December (The only exception to this was when disruption of the fixture list was caused by inclement weather)

See also 
1966–67 Northern Rugby Football League season
1966 Lancashire Cup
1966 Yorkshire Cup
BBC2 Floodlit Trophy
Rugby league county cups

References

External links
Saints Heritage Society
1896–97 Northern Rugby Football Union season at wigan.rlfans.com
Hull&Proud Fixtures & Results 1896/1897
Widnes Vikings - One team, one passion Season In Review - 1896-97
The Northern Union at warringtonwolves.org
Huddersfield R L Heritage

BBC2 Floodlit Trophy
BBC2 Floodlit Trophy